Goat Island is an island in the Missouri River in Cedar County, Nebraska, with a small portion extending into Clay County, South Dakota in the United States. It is open to the public as a part of the Missouri National Recreational River, a unit of the National Park Service.

The island was never surveyed following South Dakota and Nebraska Statehood and ownership of the island was disputed. It wasn't until 2016 that it was agreed upon that the island would be managed by the National Park Service as a part of the Missouri National Recreational River.

References

External links
 Missouri National Recreational River - U.S. National Park Service
 MNRR Water Trail
 Missouri River current river conditions and water releases (USACE)

Missouri River
Federal lands in Nebraska
Protected areas of South Dakota
Protected areas of Nebraska
Protected areas of Cedar County, Nebraska
Protected areas of Clay County, South Dakota
Islands of the Missouri River
River islands of Nebraska